Electromation Inc 309 NLRB No 163 (1992) is a US labor law case related to employer domination of labor organizations.

Facts
Teamsters Local 1049 claimed recognition for collective bargaining at Electromation Inc, which was not unionized. Teamsters claimed that Electromation Inc's practice of using "action committees" to hear worker opinions was an unlawful company union under National Labor Relations Act of 1935 §8(2)(a). The employer told the action committees that it could not continue to work with them, but even though they were discontinued, the Board heard the union's violation charge. Electromation had five 'action committees' to deal with complaints on wages, bonuses, incentive pay, attendance programs and leave policies. There were five employees and a management representative for each one, and the Employees Benefits Manager was also on each committee, who said 'management expected that employee members on the Committees would kind of talk back and forth with the other employees in the plant, get their ideas, and that... anyone [who] wanted to know what was going on, they could go to these people on the Action Committees.'

Judgment
The National Labor Relations Board held, the committees were a §2(5) labor organization and management had dominated it, so there was a §8(a)(2) violation. All members gave opinions. The Board suggested that, although Electromation's committees were a sham management tool, an independent employee elected work council faced no difficulty under the NLRA 1935 §8(a)(2).

Chairman Stephens said the following in his opening judgment.

Dennis M. Devaney said the following.

John N. Raudabaugh analyzed §2(5) and said it was clear this was a labor organization, unless the legislation was changed. On §8(a)(2) he said that the NLRA 1935 was passed on the theory of an adversarial, rather than a cooperative collective labor relations model. The cooperative view was fully taken into account and rejected. However the amendment in the LMRA 1947 made the issue very different, and Newport News would not have been decided the same. Taft-Hartley Act emphasized employee free choice to participate in a union or not.

He acknowledged that Senator Taft had rejected attempts to change §8(a)(2) but the NLRB should reflect modern changes in its judgment. Employee participation plans can be allowed. The test would be (1) extent of employer's involvement (2) whether employees think it is a collective bargaining substitute (3) whether employees had their §7 right to have a union safe (4) the employer's motive. No one decisive. Applied, here, the first criteria fails because there was no say in the committee structure, and there was no assurance of a right to collectively bargain.

See also

United States labor law

Notes

References

United States labor case law